Rum River is an unincorporated community in Granite Ledge Township, Benton County, Minnesota, United States.  The community is located near the junction of Benton County Roads 7 and 22.  Nearby places include Foley, Oak Park, and Foreston.  The West Branch of the Rum River flows nearby.

References

Unincorporated communities in Benton County, Minnesota
Unincorporated communities in Minnesota